Boudewijn Zenden (born 15 August 1976) also known by his nickname "Bolo", is a Dutch former footballer who played as a left winger or as an attacking midfielder.

Named the 1997 Dutch Football Talent of the Year, Zenden played for four teams in the English Premier League, totalling 180 games and 19 goals. He also played in the highest leagues in the Netherlands, Spain and France, for PSV, Barcelona and Marseille respectively. Internationally, Zenden earned 54 caps and scored seven goals for the Netherlands, whom he represented at two UEFA European Championships and the 1998 FIFA World Cup.

Early life
Zenden was born in Maastricht, Limburg. His father Pierre Zenden is a former judoka who worked as a sports broadcaster for the public NOS broadcasting system from 1968 to 2005. Zenden played football and was also competitive in judo as a child. In 1985, Dutch club MVV Maastricht signed Zenden after watching him play for amateur club Leonidas. Two years later, he joined the youth academy of PSV.

Zenden earned his judo black belt at age 14 and was three times judo champion of his home province of Limburg. Zenden has been a strict vegetarian since age 19.

Club career

PSV
As his career developed at PSV, Zenden made the left wing position his own, displacing Peter Hoekstra and finally becoming a firm member of the starting line-up after the departure of Dutch national team player Jan Wouters. Zenden was an important part of the PSV team that won the Eredivisie championship in 1996–97, where he also received the 1997 Dutch Talent of the Year award. After another season at PSV, in which he scored 12 goals in 23 games, he moved to Spanish club Barcelona in 1998.

Barcelona
At Barcelona, Zenden became part of a large contingent of Dutch players under Barcelona's Dutch coach Louis van Gaal. He found his first-team opportunities at Barcelona limited by the form of fellow Dutchman Marc Overmars, however, who played in Zenden's favoured left wing position for both club and country. Instead, Zenden was deployed as a left wingback, a defensive role which he took on successfully, as he displaced Spanish international and local favourite Sergi. Zenden helped Barcelona win the 1998–99 La Liga championship, and in the 1999–2000 season, he scored his only three goals for the club. After Van Gaal's resignation as coach in 2000, however, first team appearances became more scarce for Zenden. At the end of the 2000–01 season, English club Chelsea bought him for £7.5 million.

Chelsea
In his two years at Chelsea, Zenden played in the 2002 FA Cup final, a 2–0 defeat to Arsenal, however he struggled to maintain a constant place in the starting line-up mainly due to persistent injuries.

Middlesbrough
Zenden was loaned out to Middlesbrough for the 2003–04 season. Here he found playing success, as he scored the winning goal in the 2004 League Cup final against Bolton Wanderers to secure Middlesbrough their first major trophy in club history. When his contract with Chelsea expired in the summer 2004, he moved to Middlesbrough on a free transfer, signing a one-year contract for the 2004–05 season. He was deployed in a central midfield position, where he played 36 of 38 league games, scoring five goals in the process, and was voted the Middlesbrough fans' 2005 Player of the Year. However, it would be his last for Middlesbrough, as he left in the summer of 2005 when his contract ran out.

Liverpool
Zenden joined newly crowned UEFA Champions League champions Liverpool on 4 July 2005. He started his Liverpool career being used regularly as a left midfielder, and was in the starting line-up as Liverpool won the 2005 UEFA Super Cup. However, he suffered a serious cruciate ligament injury in his right knee in December 2005, which ruled him out for the rest of the season. He recovered for the start of the 2006–07 season and was part of the Liverpool team that won the 2006 FA Community Shield. After the departure of German central midfielder Dietmar Hamann in the summer of 2006, Liverpool manager Rafael Benítez indicated that he saw Zenden as an option in the central midfield.

Zenden suffered a further knee injury playing against Manchester City on 25 November 2006, for which he underwent corrective surgery.

Zenden played in both legs of Liverpool's Champions League semi-final against former club Chelsea, scoring Liverpool's first penalty in the penalty shootout at the end of the second leg, which Liverpool won 4–1. He went on to start in the final, which Liverpool lost to Milan. Zenden scored twice during his spell at Liverpool with goals against West Ham United and Portsmouth in the Premier League.

Marseille
On 24 May 2007, it was announced by Liverpool manager Rafael Benítez that Zenden's contract would not be renewed and that he was allowed to talk to other clubs, and on 6 July 2007, Zenden signed a two-year contract with Marseille. He made his competitive debut for Marseille on 11 August 2007, starting and eventually being substituted in a 0–0 stalemate with Rennes. At Marseille, Zenden struggled for regular football. In the 2008–09 Ligue 1 season, he featured 13 times (predominately as a substitute) scoring three goals.

After being released, Zenden revealed that he wanted to end his career in England, with Blackburn Rovers and Portsmouth interested in the player. In October 2009, he went to Sunderland on trial. He signed after impressing Sunderland manager Steve Bruce.

Sunderland

In October 2009, Zenden signed a contract with Sunderland which tied him down until the end of the 2009–10 season. Zenden signed in time to make his debut against former club Liverpool and he did an excellent job helping Sunderland to retain their one-goal lead after coming on as a substitute for the injured Lee Cattermole. His Sunderland career often saw him play as a substitute without starting any matches and he had suffered an injury in between, but after recovery he was named in the squad to face his old club Chelsea at Stamford Bridge on 16 January 2010, and within less than ten minutes of coming on as a second-half substitute he scored his first goal for the club, a fine half-volley to reduce his team's deficit to 5–1, having been 4–0 down at half-time. The Black Cats eventually succumbed to a 7–2 defeat. On 3 April 2010, Zenden scored his second goal for Sunderland, a left-footed volley in a 3–1 win against Tottenham Hotspur at the Stadium of Light.

On 17 May 2010, Zenden signed a new one-year contract at the club. Zenden's first start of the season came in Sunderland's 0–0 draw with Manchester United, where he hit the post. Zenden became a YouTube hit after celebrating a goal with Asamoah Gyan in Sunderland's 3–0 victory at Chelsea. Zenden notched his first of the season against Bolton in a 2–1 away win, on 7 May, which he dedicated to his ill father. Following the match, manager Steve Bruce confirmed Zenden would be offered a new contract at the club. Zenden, however, revealed he would quit the club at the end of the season to prolong his career. On 22 May 2011, his last game for Sunderland, he scored the opening goal in a 3–0 win over already-relegated West Ham on the final day of the 2010–11 Premier League season.

International career
Zenden made his debut for the Netherlands national team in a 1998 FIFA World Cup qualification match against San Marino on 30 April 1997. He was included in the starting formation and played the entire match as the Netherlands won 6–0. He was called up to represent the Netherlands at the 1998 World Cup finals in France, where Zenden started the tournament as a substitute. Coming on twice as a substitute, he was selected to start in the semi-final loss to Brazil. He was once more selected to play in the third-place playoff against Croatia, where he scored a goal after a solo run and a powerful long-range shot. After scoring, he attempted to celebrate with an acrobatic somersault, but failed, throwing himself head first to the ground.

It was during the run-up to UEFA Euro 2000 that he gained acclaim, with the tournament itself providing the platform some of his finest performances. His raw pace and acceleration down the flank, coupled with his ability to function both as a wing-forward and as a wing-back made him a versatile player to have in the squad. His man of the match performance in a friendly against Germany at the turn of the millennium cemented his position in the national team – he set up the opening goal for Patrick Kluivert, then added his own name to the scoresheet with a thunderous volley from Ronald de Boer's corner, before nearly putting the gloss on the finish when he left the entire German defence for dead with his raw pace, beat the goalkeeper with his shot, only for it to rebound off the upright.

Zenden played in all five Dutch matches at Euro 2000. Carrying his pre-tournament form into the tournament proper, Zenden grabbed a goal against Denmark and the winner against France to help the Netherlands finish top of Group D. The Dutch annihilated Yugoslavia 6–1 in the quarter-final; Zenden once again put in a stellar performance, including the assist for what turned out to be Kluivert's hat-trick goal. He started the semi-final against Italy, but he was substituted in a game that would see the Dutch be eliminated on penalties.

Zenden featured again in Euro 2004, though he only played the first half of the first match against Germany. Following the tournament, Zenden, like other experienced players including Clarence Seedorf and Edgar Davids, found himself excluded from the national squad selection by new Dutch national team coach Marco van Basten.

Managerial career
On 22 November 2012, Zenden replaced Eddie Newton as ex-club Chelsea's new assistant manager when Rafael Benítez took over as manager.

Career statistics

Club

International

Scores and results list the Netherlands' goal tally first, score column indicates score after each Zenden goal.

Honours
PSV
Eredivisie: 1996–97
KNVB Cup: 1995–96
Johan Cruyff Shield: 1996, 1997

Barcelona
La Liga: 1998–99

Chelsea
FA Cup runner-up: 2001–02

Middlesbrough
Football League Cup: 2003–04

Liverpool
FA Community Shield: 2006
UEFA Super Cup: 2005
UEFA Champions League runner-up: 2006–07

Individual
Dutch Young Player of the Year: 1997

References

External links

Premier League profile
Photos and stats at Sporting Heroes.net

1976 births
Living people
Dutch footballers
Netherlands international footballers
Association football midfielders
Premier League players
La Liga players
PSV Eindhoven players
FC Barcelona players
Chelsea F.C. players
Middlesbrough F.C. players
Liverpool F.C. players
Olympique de Marseille players
Sunderland A.F.C. players
Footballers from Maastricht
1998 FIFA World Cup players
UEFA Euro 2000 players
UEFA Euro 2004 players
Eredivisie players
Ligue 1 players
Expatriate footballers in England
Expatriate footballers in France
Expatriate footballers in Spain
Dutch expatriate footballers
Dutch expatriate sportspeople in England
Dutch expatriate sportspeople in France
Dutch expatriate sportspeople in Spain
Sint-Maartenscollege (Maastricht) alumni
FA Cup Final players
Association football coaches